Cisthene is a genus of moths.

Cisthene or Kisthene may also refer to:
 Cisthene, another ancient name of the island of Megiste
Cisthene (Lycia), a town of ancient Lycia, now in Turkey
Cisthene (Mysia), a town of ancient Mysia, now in Turkey
Cisthene, a place with the mythical Gorgoneian plains mentioned in the Prometheus Vinctus of Aeschylus